Montigny-en-Gohelle is a commune in the Pas-de-Calais department in the Hauts-de-France region of France.

Geography
The A21 autoroute runs straight through the commune.

Population

Places of interest
 The church of St.Madeleine, rebuilt along with most of the town, after the First World War.

Twin Towns 

  Hrastnik
  Stollberg
  Johannesburg
  Tamási
  Ruda Śląska

See also
Communes of the Pas-de-Calais department

References

External links

 Official town website
 An unofficial town website
 Website of the agglomération d'Hénin-Carvin

Montignyengohelle
Artois